Senji is a village in western outskirts of Chennai located in Tiruvallur district in the Indian state of Tamil Nadu. Agriculture is the major occupation in this village.  It is located 14 KM towards North from District head quarters Vellore. 7 KM from K.V.Kuppam. 151 KM from State capital Chennai

Transport
The village is in between Tiruvallur and Arakkonam, and the neighbourhood is served by the Senji Panambakkam railway station of the Chennai Suburban Railway Network.

The major transportation of Senji is Railways. It is located in Chennai - Arakkonam suburban railway route. It is very close to Chennai central almost 90 mins travel. This village is connected with Chennai Central, Chennai Beach, Velachery, Perambur, Avadi, Ambattur, Tiruvallur, Arakkonam, Thiruthani by suburban trains.

It is also connected to the city through MTC buses operated from Perambakkam, a town located south of Senji.

Location

References

Suburbs of Chennai
Cities and towns in Tiruvallur district